Seuerling is a surname. Notable people with the surname include:

Carl Seuerling (1727-1795), German-born Swedish stage actor and theatre director
Charlotta Seuerling (1782/84–1828), Swedish concert singer, harpsichordist, composer and poet
Margareta Seuerling (1747–1820), Swedish actress and theatre director